John Astley may refer to:

 John Astley (courtier) (c. 1507–1596), MP for Cricklade 1559, and for Boroughbridge 1563
 John Astley (Master of the Revels), (died 1641), his son, a politician who became Master of the Revels
 Sir John Astley, 2nd Baronet, of Pateshull (1687–1772), Member of Parliament (MP) for Shrewsbury 1727–1734 and Shropshire 1734–1772
 John Astley (painter) (1720–1787), English portrait painter and beau
 John Astley (clergyman) (1735–1803), Rector of parishes in Norfolk
 Sir John Dugdale Astley, 1st Baronet, of Everley (1778–1842), MP for Wiltshire 1820–1832, Wiltshire North, 1832–1835
 Sir John Dugdale Astley, 3rd Baronet, of Everley (1828–1894), MP for Lincolnshire North 1874–1880
 John Astley (snooker player) (born 1989), English snooker player
 Jon Astley, British record producer

See also
John Ashley (disambiguation)